Emilio Antonio Fossas Morejon (born September 23, 1957) is a former left-handed Major League Baseball pitcher who played between 1988 and 1999.

Amateur career
Fossas attended St. Mary's High School (Brookline, Massachusetts) and was signed as a 12th round pick by the Texas Rangers during the 1979 Major League Baseball Amateur Draft. The previous year he was drafted by the Minnesota Twins, but decided not to sign with the team, instead finishing his college studies and collegiate career at University of South Florida in Tampa. In 1978, he played collegiate summer baseball for the Falmouth Commodores of the Cape Cod Baseball League.

Professional career
At the age of 31, Fossas received a promotion to the majors in 1988 with the Rangers, who released him during the offseason. Although he only pitched  innings that initial year, Fossas eventually became an entrenched yeoman setup pitcher with the Milwaukee Brewers from 1989 to 1990, the Boston Red Sox from 1991 to 1994, and the St. Louis Cardinals from 1995 to 1997.

Fossas' greatest success came as a left-handed specialist reliever, or LOOGY, a pitcher who was brought in expressly to face one or two particularly dangerous left-handed batters (during Fossas's tenure, this included such players as Fred McGriff, Ken Griffey Jr., Barry Bonds, and George Brett). For example, against the hall of famers, Brett and Griffey, Fossas held them to only 6 hits in 42 at bats, which is a .143 batting average. As a left-handed reliever with an unorthodox delivery, he was well-suited to this role, and often faced only one or two batters in each appearance. With Boston in 1992, Fossas made 60 appearances, but due to his specialized use he pitched a total of less than 30 innings. Fossas amassed 7 career saves; five of those required him to only retire one batter (a left handed hitter) for the final out. 

In 1998 he pitched for the Seattle Mariners, Chicago Cubs and returned to the Texas Rangers in what would be his last full year before finishing his career with the New York Yankees in 1999.

Coaching career
Fossas became a pitching coach for Florida Atlantic University Owls in 2005. He became the pitching coach for the minor league Dayton Dragons in 2009. Fossas lives in Florida with his wife Pura, daughter Keila, son Mark.

References

External links

Tony Fossas at Baseball Almanac
Tony Fossas at Baseball Library
Florida Atlantic University bio

1958 births
Living people
Baseball players from Havana
Asheville Tourists players
Boston Red Sox players
Burlington Rangers players
Chicago Cubs players
Columbus Clippers players
Denver Zephyrs players
Edmonton Trappers players
Falmouth Commodores players
Gulf Coast Rangers players
Iowa Cubs players
Major League Baseball pitchers
Major League Baseball players from Cuba
Cuban expatriate baseball players in the United States
Milwaukee Brewers players
New York Yankees players
Pawtucket Red Sox players
Oklahoma City 89ers players
Oklahoma City RedHawks players
St. Louis Cardinals players
South Florida Bulls baseball players
Seattle Mariners players
Texas Rangers players
Tulsa Drillers players
Cuban expatriate baseball players in Canada
Plataneros de Tabasco players
Cuban expatriate baseball players in Mexico